Templemania millistriata is a species of moth of the  family Tortricidae. It is found in Veracruz, Mexico.

References

Moths described in 1914
Atteriini